Gessius (floruit 420–443) was a politician of the Eastern Roman Empire, brother of the Empress Aelia Eudocia.

Life 

Gessius was born in Athens, son of the pagan and sophist philosopher Leontius, and brother of Valerius and Athenais. In 421 Athenais changed her name in Aelia Eudocia and married the Emperor Theodosius II; as result, Valerius and Gessius received several honours. Gessius become Praetorian prefect of Illyricum, an office he probably lost after his sister lost her influence on the Emperor in 443 and went to Jerusalem.

See also 
 Gessia gens

Sources 
 

5th-century Byzantine people
Praetorian prefects of the Illyricum
Byzantine Athenians
Theodosian dynasty